Mária Balážová (born 31 August 1956 in Trnava, Slovakia, former Czechoslovakia) is a contemporary Slovak artist. Her practise as an artist is usually associated with new geometry, post-geometry and postmodern.

Life and work
Balážová studied at the Academy of Muse Arts, Bratislava and Magister of Arts degree received in 1984. Balážová is also known as a teacher at the University of Trnava - since 1997. Husband - Blažej Baláž, slovak painter.

Immediately at the beginning, Mária Balážová, created her own „personal mythology“, emphasizing a snake motif in the geometrically stylised form of a cobra. This animal, which occupies an important position in world mythologies and religions, became the main motif of cycles of paintings, to which the artist gave the name Serpent Geometry. Balážová distinguished herself from classic Neo-Constructivism, outlined on subjectless combinations of shapes and colours, put together into geometric structures. Art theorists appreciate the „new significance“ she achieved by creating radically reductive forms (Jiří Valoch, 2002). "

In her latest works, fear of violence, power and hegemony are projected in the intimate family background, where the dominant men´s element is systematically planned in the painting area and it culminates in the series of drawings and paintings called Domestic Violence. A distinctly expressive handwriting used in some places refers very straightforwardly to Balážová´s personal story and moves the general criticism of an androcentric society to a more intimate position. Here, the key role is played by the figure of a despotic father who permanently and demonically comes back in acrylic canvases and large-format drawings – destructively and aggressively . In the latest works, Mária Balážová bet on a straightforward expression of her personal story associated with a therapeutic character. This approach in her works represents a new dimension not only for her herself, but also for geometric painting in general. (Roman Gajdoš)

Her works are held in the collections of Slovak National Gallery, Bratislava, National Gallery, Prague (CZ), Wannieck Gallery Brno (CZ), Jan Koniarek Gallery , Trnava.

The artist has been a member of the revived Club of Concrete Artists 2 and the artist's group East of Eden. She lives and works in Trnava.

Awards

 1990 Honorable Mention, Drawing 1990, Provo (USA)
 1995 Prize of Masaryk's Academy, Prague (CZ)
 2019 Honorary Mention Award, International Drawing Biennale India 2018-19, New Delhi (India)

Selected solo exhibitions
 Maria Balazova, Jan Koniarek Gallery, Trnava, 26 June  – 30 July 1991 (catalogue)
 Maria Balazova, Gallery Arpex, Bratislava, 28 January  – 17 February 1993
 Serpent Geometry, Cyprian Majernik Gallery, Bratislava, 19 April  – 8 May 1995
 Serpent Geometry 2, Jan Koniarek Gallery, Trnava, 23 May  – 23 June 1996 (catalogue)
 Dozen 1988-2000, The Central Slovakian Gallery, Banská Bystrica, 5 May  – 30 June 2000
 Dozen 1988-2000, The East Slovak Gallery, Košice, 14 September  – 15 October 2000
 Nadowessioux, Bratislava City Gallery, 1 February – 11 March 2001
 Mária and Blažej Baláž : The Discreet Charm of the Painting , House of Art, Česke Budějovice, 27 March – 21 April 2002, Czech Republic
 Alphabet, Jan Koniarek Gallery, Trnava, 9 September – 24 October 2004 (catalogue)
 New significance, Nitra Gallery, Nitra, 28 June – 23 July 2007
 Mária Balážová : Post-Geo, Liptov Gallery, Liptovský Mikuláš, 10 February – 9 April 2011
 Mária Balážová-Blažej Baláž : Post-Geo-Text, Slowakisches Institut, Berlin, 14 April – 30 May 2011, Germany
 Mária Balážová : Male and Female Pictures, Gallery of Art, Nové Zámky, 7 February – 16 March 2013
 Mária Balážová – From Order to Chaos, Martin, Turiec Gallery, 11 September - 2 November 2014
 Mária Balážová – Female Geometry, Bratislava, Gallery Z, 2 September - 9 October 2016
 Mária Balážová – Geo-Femina,The Central Slovakian Gallery, Banská Bystrica, 18 May  – 27 June 2017
 Mária Balážová – Under the Skirt,The Museum of Art, Žilina, 19 October  – 19 November 2017
 Mária Balážová – Women´s Tread, Jan Koniarek Gallery, Trnava,  12 September  – 27 October 2019

Selected group exhibitions
Interplays, Prague, National Museum, Czech Republic, 1987
Art Basel 20´89, Basel, Switzerland, 1989
Drawing 1990, Provo, Utah, USA, 1990
Vth International Drawing Triennale, Wroclaw, Poland, 1992
Fibre, Slovak National Gallery, Bratislava, Slovakia, 1994
1st International Triennial of Graphic Arts, Sofia, Bulgaria, 1995
BRIDGing, Esztergom, Duna Múzeum, Hungary, 1997
Club of Concretists, Bratislava, Slovak National Gallery, Bratislava, Slovakia, 1999
Neo-Constructivism in Slovak Art, Jan Koniarek Gallery, Trnava, Slovakia, 2000
Eine kurze Geschichte zur Malerei, Leverkusen, Germany, 2001
Slovak Contemporary Art, Prague, Gallery Art Factory, Czech Republic, 2002
Slovak Contemporary Art, Krakow, International Cultural Centre, Poland, 2004
Draught / Contemporary Slovak Painting 2000-2005, Prague, City Gallery, Czech Republic, 2006
Allied... , National Gallery, Prague, Czech Republic, 2006
Contemporary Slovak Art 1960-2000, National Museum of Contemporary Art (Romania), Bucharest, Romania, 2007
1960 – present / The Slovak Art, Prague, City Gallery, Czech Republic, 2008
Borders of Geometry, Bratislava, House of Art Bratislava, Slovakia, 2010
After Hours : Phase 2 / Artists from Slovakia, Santa Ana, Orange County Center for Contemporary Art, USA, 2010
Daisies and clones, Bratislava, Slovak National Gallery, Slovakia, 2011
ObraSKov/ Contemporary Slovak Painting, Brno, Wannieck Gallery, Czech Republic, 2011
IV New Zlin Sallon, Zlin, Regional Gallery of Fine Arts, Czech Republic, 2011
VIII. International Biennial of Drawing Pilsen 2012, Pilsen, Czech Republic, 2012
IX. International Biennial of Drawing Pilsen 2014, Pilsen, Czech Republic, 2014
3rd International Salon Graphics, Kraljevo (RS), 2015
Here and Now, Budapest, Kunsthalle (HU), 2015
5th International Drawing Triennale, Tallinn, Kunsthalle (EE), 2015
4th International Salon Graphics, Kraljevo (RS), 2016
Osten Biennial of Drawing Skopje 2016, Osten Drawing, Skopje (MK), 2016
Socially alive, Bratislava, Slovak Union of Visual Arts, 2016
Sew Long! Fashion in Slovakia 1945-1989, Slovak National Gallery, Bratislava, Slovakia, 2017
Contemporary European Geometrically Tendencies, Slovak Union of Visual Arts, Bratislava, Slovakia, 2018
Hommage à Peter Vajda, Prague, Museum Kampa – The Jan a Meda Mládek Foundation, Czech Republic, 2018
International Drawing Biennale India 2018-19, New Delhi  India, 2019

Works

 Archetyp (1988) : Collection of Slovak National Gallery, Bratislava
 Pose VII (1989)
 Rocket Man 1 (1989)
 Lexicon 1 (1990)
 Flowing 6 (1993) : Collection of Jan Koniarek Gallery, Trnava
 Serpent Geometry 2 (1994) : Collection of Jan Koniarek Gallery, Trnava
 Serpent Geometry 3 (1994)
 Serpent Geometry 5 (1996)
 Serpent Geometry 15 – Church (1998)
 Serpent Geometry 33 – Fatum (2000/01)
 Serpent Geometry 40 – Alphabet 3 (2002) : Collection of National Gallery, Prague
 Serpent Geometry 43 (2004)
 Serpent Geometry 49 - Portrait  (2005/06) : Collection of Wannieck Gallery Brno
 Serpent Geometry – Shoot (2005)
 Serpent Geometry 70 – History (2005/07)
 Chaos 1 (2006/09)
 Domestic Violence 5 (2019)
 Domestic Violence 6 (2019)
 Domestic Violence 8 (2019)

Books and Catalogues

 BALGAVÁ, B. - ORAVCOVÁ, J. - VALOCH, J. 1997. Mária Balážová. Trnava : Ján Koniarek Gallery, 32 p.
 VALOCH, J. 2002. Mária Balážová / Serpent Geometry 1997-2002. Trnava : Trnava University, 12 p.
 BESKID, V. - VALOCH, J. - GAJDOŠ, R. 2009. Mária Balážová / 1985-2009. Trnava : Typi Universitatis Tyrnaviensis, (English – Slovak, colour), 111 p.

References

Further reading

 BESKID, V. 1998. 6 Slovak contemporary painters. Košice : V. Löffler Museum, 24 p.
 ORIŠKOVÁ, M. 1999. Abstract art. In GERŽOVÁ, J. 1999 (ed). Dictionary of World and Slovak Fine Art in the 2nd half of the 20th century Bratislava : Kruh súčasného umenia Profil, p. 16
 BESKID, V. 1999. New geometry. In GERŽOVÁ, J. 1999 (ed). Dictionary of World and Slovak Fine Art in the 2nd half of the 20th century. Bratislava : Kruh súčasného umenia Profil, p. 201
 BARTOŠOVÁ, Z. 1999. Mária Balážová. In Contemporary Slovak Art. Bratislava : Rabbit and Solution, p. 6
 VALOCH, J. 2001. In-between Pure Geometry and Semantics. In Ateliér, vol.14, no.6, p. 9 (CZ)
 BÖHMEROVÁ, Z. – JANČÁR, I. 2007. Slovak Graphics of the 20th Century. Bratislava : Municipal Gallery, 2007, p. 267, 314
  BARTOŠOVÁ, Z. 2007. 20th Century. In Art in Slovakia / Summary History of Pictures. Bratislava : Slovart, p. 224, 225
 TOMÁŠOVÁ, I. 2007. New significance. In Vlna, vol. IX, no.32, p. 90 - 91. Bratislava : Občianske združenie Vlna
 BELOHRADSKÁ, Ľ. – TROJANOVÁ, E. 2009. Borders of Geometry. Bratislava : PETUM, 429 p. (English – Slovak, colour)
 KNÍŽÁK, M. – VLČEK, T. (eds.). 2009. 909 / Art from the Turn of the Millennium in the National Gallery in Prague 1990 - 2009. Prague - National Gallery, p. 147, 362
 GERŽOVÁ, J. 2009. Talks about Painting. Bratislava : Slovart, VŠVU Bratislava, p. 232 - 247
 BESKID, V. 2012. The image of painting in the „Picture du nouveau“. In ObraSKovo nanovo / Contemporary Slovak Painting. Poprad : Tatranská  Gallery, p. 15
 GUILLAUME, M. 2013. Male and Female Images. In Ateliér, vol. 26, no.6, 21.3.2013, p. 8 (CZ)
 GUILLAUME, M. 2013. Mária Balážová – Personal Geometry. In Ostium, vol. 9, no.4/2013

External links
 http://www.bbalaz.sk/
 http://www.artfacts.net/en/artist/maria-balazova-148595/profile.html
 http://www.kunstaspekte.de/index.php
 http://www.artgallery.sk
 http://www.osobnosti.sk/index.php?os=zivotopis&ID=59281&mainkat=4
 :sk:Mária Balážová
 https://web.archive.org/web/20081014100026/http://pdfweb.truni.sk/fak/katedry/kpvu/mbalazova/index.html
 http://www.nitrianskagaleria.sk/index.php?cmd=vys_det&id=387
 https://www.gjk.sk/en/exhibition/archive-of-expositions/2019/maria-balazova-womans-tread/

1956 births
Living people
People from Trnava
Abstract artists
Slovak contemporary artists
Slovak painters
Concrete art
Contemporary painters
Slovak women artists
20th-century women artists
Slovak women painters